Guitar Heaven: The Greatest Guitar Classics of All Time, referred to as simply Guitar Heaven, is the twenty-first studio album by Santana, released on September 21, 2010. It is a classic rock covers album and features guest performances by several popular vocalists, including India.Arie, Joe Cocker, Chris Cornell of Soundgarden and Audioslave, Scott Stapp of Creed and Art of Anarchy, Scott Weiland of Stone Temple Pilots, Velvet Revolver and Art of Anarchy, Chris Daughtry of Daughtry, Jacoby Shaddix of Papa Roach, Chester Bennington of Linkin Park, Dead By Sunrise and Stone Temple Pilots, Rob Thomas of Matchbox Twenty, Pat Monahan of Train and rapper Nas.

The album was certified gold by the Federation of the Italian Music Industry.

Singles
The first single released from the album is the cover of Def Leppard's "Photograph" which featured Chris Daughtry peaked at number 14 on the US Bubbling Under Hot 100. The last single released from the album was the cover of  The Beatles'  "While My Guitar Gently Weeps" which featured India.Arie and Yo-Yo Ma and Fortunate Son with Scott Stapp, Under the Bridge with Andy Vargas, Dance the Night Away with Pat Monahan, Sunshine of Your Love with Rob Thomas and Smoke On the Water with Jacoby Shaddix was released as a Promotional Singles.

Commercial performance
In his home country of United States, the album debuted at number 5 on the Billboard 200, selling 66,000 copies in its first week.

Track listing

Personnel
Carlos Santana – lead guitar
Dennis Chambers – drums
Benny Rietveld – bass guitar
Karl Perazzo – timbales
Tommy Anthony – rhythm guitar
Freddie Ravel – keyboards
Andy Vargas – background vocals
Raul Rekow – congas
Bill Ortiz – trumpet
Jeff Cressman – trombone

Production
Produced by Carlos Santana and Clive Davis
Tracks produced by Matt Serletic and Howard Benson

Charts

Weekly charts

Year-end charts

Certifications

References

External links
 Guitar Heaven analysis 
 

Santana (band) albums
2010 albums
Covers albums
Albums produced by Carlos Santana
Albums produced by Clive Davis
Albums produced by Matt Serletic
Albums produced by Howard Benson
Arista Records albums